Below is the list of the 300 members of the Hellenic Parliament following the May 2012 Greek legislative election. This Parliament lasted only two days, convening for the first time on 17 May 2012, and electing the Speaker on 18 May 2012. On 19 May 2012 the President proclaimed new elections thus ending the parliamentary term.

Members of Parliament

Sources 
Hellenic Parliament website

2012 05
2012 in Greek politics